Irchenrieth is a municipality in the district of Neustadt an der Waldnaab in Bavaria in Germany.

References

Neustadt an der Waldnaab (district)